Bruchia scapularis is a species of beetle found in the family Chrysomelidae. It is found in South America.
It is also named as being found in 2007.

References 

Cassidinae
Beetles described in 2007